"Zvezda po imeni Solntse" is a song by the Soviet rock band Kino from the album of the same name released in 1988. The song is generally considered to be one of Kino's most popular songs. It is popular among novice guitarists in Eastern Europe, and there are many cover versions. The song is broadcast daily by Russian radio stations.

Cover versions 
The American indie pop band Brazzaville recorded a cover version of the song in English called "Star Called Sun" for their 2006 album, East L.A. Breeze. The lyrics are not a direct translation, but are instead about the death of the singer's mother.

The song was sung in Udmurt by the folklore band Buranovskiye Babushki. Praskovia Fyodorova translated the song into Udmurt.

Vyacheslav Butusov recorded the song for the 2000 tribute album to Kino, KINOproby. Butusov has also played the song in concerts with his band U-Piter. It is part of a concert program of «Imya zvyozd».

Cover versions have also been made by Inspector, Mara, Natali, and Rybin-band.

The science fiction writer Vladimir Vasilyev wrote a fourth verse for the song in his book Black Palmira's Face, which takes place in the same universe as Sergei Lukyanenko's Watch series.

Artists 
The artists performing the album version of the song are:
 Viktor Tsoi — vocals, guitar
 Yuri Kasparyan — lead guitar
 Igor Tikhomirov — bass guitar
 Georgiy Guryanov — drums

References 
The song is heard in the films The Forced March and The Needle. The 2002 compilation album Kino v Kino includes the version of "Zvezda po imeni Solntse" used in The Needle. The song was also included in the album The History of this World. The song is used in the 1988 movie The Needle, directed by Rashid Nugmanov, and was written by Viktor Tsoi during filming.

Legacy 
Nashe Radio ranked the song 12th on its list of the "Top 100 Songs of the 20th Century".

References 

Songs about death
Songs about mothers
1988 songs
Anti-war songs
Soviet songs
Kino (band) songs